Andreya Triana is a British singer and songwriter, Red Bull Music Academy alumna and MOBO nominated artist hailing from South East London, Her debut album, Lost Where I Belong released in September 2010 on London based record label Ninja Tune and featured singles such as "A Town Called Obsolete", "Far Closer" and the title track "Lost where I belong". The album was produced by British musician, DJ Simon Green aka Bonobo. The album was later labelled as "Best Album of 2010" by Charles Aaron of Spin.

Triana's second album, Giants was released in May 2015 on Counter Records, and peaked at number 59 on the Official UK Albums Chart. The lead single from the album Gold expanded Triana's fanbase and gained exposure after a string of television performances on The One Show, The John Bishop Show, and Later with Jools Holland. The track was also featured in the 2020 Nissan Vera advert.

Triana's best known work features songs such as "Song For A Friend", "Gold", and "Woman", which have featured in multiple TV and film pieces.

Triana's third album Life in Colour was released in May 2019 on Hi-Tea Records. Triana collaborated with multiple producers for Life in Colour, notably French Grammy-nominated musician and DJ Dimitri Tikovoï who produced the majority of the album. The album was described as a "finger clicking, booty popping collection of summery joy" by Clash magazine features the singles "Woman", "Freedom", and "Broke".

Early life and education 
Triana moved to Worcester in the West Midlands age 14. At 17 she started doing open mic night at a local music venue where the owner introduced her to a collective of musicians, with whom she formed a group called Bootis. While studying for a degree in music technology in Leeds, Triana decided to re-form Bootis with new members and a new multi-genre sound.

Soon, her love for improvisation would birth her Freeflo Sessions - a one woman show using a sampler to loop vocals, percussive sounds, and beats live. As a result of touring extensively with her Freeflo Sessions, she was selected in 2006 to participate in the 'Red Bull Music Academy in Australia, where she further developed her style for improvisation and developed strong links within the music industry.

 Inspiration 
Triana is an experimental, self-taught, singer, and songwriter originally hailing from South East London. Her Husky voice is reminiscent of predecessors Lauryn Hill. Her style has been described as a fusion of soul, jazz, and pop. Triana has named a few of her greatest inspirations as Aretha Franklin, Stevie Wonder, Bill Withers, and Bjork

 Touring / gigs 
In 2009, Triana toured the US and Canada with the Bonobo live band, and shortly afterwards played the BBC Introducing Stage at Glastonbury Festival in 2010. Triana has also played stages at multiple festivals, notably Soundwave Festival, The Great Escape, Secret Garden Party, Bestival, Outlook, and Big Chill Festival.

Triana reached new heights in 2015 as she made her second appearance, performing live at Glastonbury Festival on the Greenpeace Stage, and headlining a sold-out show at the historic venue KOKO in London.

Her largest audience however was a main stage performance to 50,000 people for BBC Radio 2 - Live in Hyde Park in 2016.

Triana has also had a string of DJ performances featuring sets at BlackSITTER - The Cactus Hound Bar and Gilles Peterson's ‘We Out Here’ Festival.

As of 2021, Triana joined UK neo-soul collective Jungle as an active touring member, replacing longtime backup vocalist Rudi Salmon.

 Awards 
In 2016, Triana was invited to be a judge for Best Album at the Ivor Novello awards alongside fellow musicians Tinchy Stryder and Sharleen Spiteri.

At the 2015 MOBO awards, Triana was nominated for Best R&B/Soul Act and later performed ‘Playing With Fire’ on the main stage at the awards to a sea of her fellow musicians.

 Television / media features 

Andreya's music has featured in shows such as The Good Wife, Grey's Anatomy, Being Mary Jane, Self Made, and When They See Us, which collected 23 million viewers within its first month.

August 2021 - "Beautiful People" from Triana's album Life in Colour featured on NBA 2K-22

March 2020 - "Woman" from Triana's album Life in Colour featured on Self Made Season 1, Ep 2

July 2019 - "Beautiful People" from Triana's album Life in Colour featured on Love Island (UK) Season 5, Ep 25

June 2019 - "Heart In My Hands" from Triana's album Giants featured on Love Island (UK) Season 5, Ep 3

June 2019 - "Woman" from Triana's album Life in Colour featured on Schwarzkopf Live XXL advert for their campaign #GENERATIONCOLOUR

May 2019 - "Song For A Friend" from Triana's album Giants featured on When They See Us Season 1, Ep 3

March 2019 - "Woman" from Triana's album Life in Colour featured on Good Trouble Season 1, Ep 9

September 2019 - "Gold" from Triana's album Giants featured on the 2020 Nissan Versa advert and also in Target's "Good We Can All Afford" campaign.

July 2018 - "Lullaby" from Triana's album Giants featured on Our Girl Season 3, Ep 12

January 2018 - "Gold" from Triana's album Giants featured on Burden of Truth Season 1, Ep 3

September 2018 - "Beautiful People" from Triana's album Life in Colour featured on EA Sports FIFA 19 Soundtrack

July 2017 - "Gold" from Triana's album Giants featured on So You Think You Can Dance Season 14, Ep7

June 2017 - "Heart In My Hands" from Triana's album Giants featured on Queen Sugar Season 2, Ep 2

March 2017 - "Heart In My Hands" from Triana's album Giants featured on Grace and Frankie Season 3, Ep 10

Feb 2017 - "Gold" from Triana's album Giants featured on Being Mary Jane Season 4, Ep 7

November 2016 - "Lost Where I Belong" from Triana's album Lost Where I Belong featured on Queen Sugar Season 1, Ep 13

October 2016 - "Heart In My Hands" from Triana's album Giants featured on Grey's Anatomy Season 13, Ep 3

September 2014 - Andreya's track "Better Days To Come" Featured on Forza Horizon 2

June 2014 - "Draw the Stars" from Triana's album Lost Where I Belong featured on Chasing Life Season 1, Ep 1

March 2013 - "Draw the Stars" from Triana's album Lost Where I Belong featured on The Good Wife Season 4, Ep 17

October 2010 - "Draw the Stars" from Triana's album Lost Where I Belong featured on 90210 Season 3, Ep 5

 Live television performances 
October 2015 - Live Performance of Gold on Chris Evans' TFI FridayDecember 2015 - Live Performance Sunday BrunchApril 2015 - Live Performance of "Gold" on Later... with Jools HollandMay 2015 - Live Performance of "Gold" on The One ShowJune 2015 - Live Performance of "Gold" at Glastonbury Festival.

July 2015 - Live Performance of "Gold" on The John Bishop ShowAugust 2019 - Live Performance of "Freedom" on The One Show.

 Feature collaborations / sessions 
During her time at Red Bull Music Academy, Triana collaborated with now-legendary electronic musician and producer Flying Lotus to create "Tea Leaf Dancers". The track was hailed as a classic, getting rave reviews from Benji B and Gilles Peterson while getting airplay on Annie Mac's Radio One show.

Simon Green also known as DJ and musician Bonobo, featured Triana's vocals on 2010 album Black Sands on the tracks "Eyes Down", "The Keeper", and "Stay The Same"

In 2013 Triana also featured on Breach’s Top 10 single "Everything You Never Had (We Had It All)", which reached no. 9 on the Official Singles chart.

- Triana also featured on Los Angeles-based producer Tokimonsta’s 2013 album Half Shadows on the track "Green"

- Triana featured on the tracks "U never know" and "Puzzle" from Essex-based electronic producer Lapalux’s 2015 album Lustmore.

- Triana joined acclaimed jazz artist Jamie Cullum in the Radio 2 studio in 2018 for a soulful rendition of "Silent Night".

- Triana collaborated with Bristol based artist, Henry Green, featuring on the tracks "Tide" and "More" from Henry's 2020 album Half Light.

- Triana is also the main feature artist The Vision's debut self titled album.TEDx FrankfurtIn November 2019 Triana was a guest speaker at TEDx Frankfurt, where she also performed renditions of her tracks "A Town Called Obsolete" and "Woman"Mahogany SessionsIn 2019 Triana was invited to perform at the infamous Mahogany Sessions where she gave a rendition of ‘Broke’ from her 2019 album ‘Life in Colour’. Other artists to be invited to perform for Mahogany Sessions feature Billy Eiilish, James Bay, and Jake Bugg.Sofar Sounds'Triana has been invited to perform with Sofar Sounds twice now, firstly in 2015 where she performed ‘That's Alright With Me’ from her sophomore album ‘Giants’ and secondly in 2019 where she performed ‘Woman’'' from her third album ‘Life in Colour’. Andreya's 2015 performance is Sofar’s most watched video in Europe with 4 million views.

Discography

Albums

EP's

Singles

Features

Remixes

References

External links 

 – official site

Year of birth missing (living people)
Living people
English women singer-songwriters
English people of Jamaican descent
English soul singers
Musicians from London
Ninja Tune artists
21st-century Black British women singers
Counter Records artists